Santa Inês is a municipality in the state of Maranhão in the North-East region of Brazil. .Geography: the climate of city is tropical with dry season.

The municipality contains a small part of the Baixada Maranhense Environmental Protection Area, a  sustainable use conservation unit created in 1991 that has been a Ramsar Site since 2000..Was emancipated from Pindaré Mirim in 1967.

The city has one of the most important railway stations on the Carajás Railway line.

See also
List of municipalities in Maranhão

References

Municipalities in Maranhão